Musa Station (武佐駅) is the name of multiple train stations in Japan:

 Musa Station (Hokkaido)
 Musa Station (Shiga)